Ramabadran Gopalakrishnan (born 25 December 1945) is an Indian businessman and author. Until his retirement he was an executive director of Tata Sons Ltd and served on the boards of Tata Power, Tata Technologies, AkzoNobel India, Castrol India and ABP Pvt. Ltd. Before joining Tata he was Vice Chairman of Hindustan Lever, the Indian subsidiary of Unilever plc.

Gopalakrishnan earned a bachelor's degree in Physics from St Xavier's College, Calcutta University, a bachelor's degree in Electronics from IIT Kharagpur in 1967 and did a six-week Advanced Management Programme from Harvard Business School, United States.

He has lived and worked in India, the UK and Saudi Arabia. He began his career in 1967 as a computer analyst with Hindustan Lever. He worked in the marketing function before moving to general management. During his years with Unilever, he was based in Jeddah as CEO of the Arabia unit; later, he was managing director of Brooke Bond Lipton India and then vice-chairman with Hindustan Lever. He has been president of the All India Management Association. He is married and has three children.

Publications

References

External links 
 R. Gopalakrishnan at Penguin India

1949 births
Living people
St. Xavier's College, Kolkata alumni
University of Calcutta alumni
Tata Group people
IIT Kharagpur alumni
Indian chief executives